This is a list of wineries and vineyards in New England.  New England wines are known for their diverse styles and for the effects of maritime climates on grape-growing. Wine making in New England today has been described by New Hampshire winemaker Bob Manley as "a little reminiscent of what it was like in California – actually, even in Napa – in the '50s and '60s." Historian Samuel Eliot Morison uses the metaphor of wine to describe the relationship between present New England culture and its past:

Inclusion criteria: This list should only include wineries with Wikipedia articles or citations to third-party sources.

Connecticut

This is a list of wineries and vineyards in Connecticut.

 Chamard Vineyards
 Haight-Brown (1975) - first winery in Connecticut
 Hopkins Vineyard
 Jonathan Edwards Winery
 Jones Family Farms Winery
 Maugle Sierra Vineyards
 Sharpe Hill Vineyard

Maine

This is a list of wineries and vineyards in Maine.
 Anthony Lee's Winery, Dexter
 Bar Harbor Cellars, Bar Harbor
 Bartlett Maine Estate Winery, Gouldsboro - Maine's oldest winery
 Catherine Hill Winery, Cherryfield
 Cellardoor Winery & Vineyards, Lincolnville - Maine's oldest vineyard
 Dragonfly Winery, Stetson
 Hidden Spring Winery, Hodgdon
 Oyster River Winegrowers, Warren - 2021 pick for Down East's "Best of Maine"
 Prospect Hill Winery, Lebanon
 Savage Oakes Vineyard And Winery, Union
 Shalom Orchard & Winery, Franklin
 Stone Tree Farm & Cidery, Unity
 Sweetgrass Farm Winery & Distillery, Union
 Tree Spirits Winery, Oakland
 Winterport Winery, Winterport

Massachusetts

This is a list of wineries and vineyards in Massachusetts.

 Boston Winery
 Black Birch Vineyard
 Plymouth Bay Winery
 Running Brook Winery
 Russell Orchards
 Truro Vineyards

New Hampshire

This is a list of wineries and vineyards in New Hampshire. 

 Flag Hill Winery, Lee
 Jewell Towne Vineyards, South Hampton
 Seven Birches Winery, Lincoln

Rhode Island

This is a list of wineries and vineyards in Rhode Island.

 Carolyn's Sakonnet Vineyards (1975), Little Compton - state's first winery
 Diamond Hill Vineyards
 Greenvale Vineyards
 Newport Vineyards
 Nickle Creek Vineyard
 Verde Vineyards

Vermont

This is a list of wineries and vineyards in Vermont.

 Snow Farm Winery, South Hero

See also

 American wine

References

Citations

Works cited
 
 
 
 
 
 
 
 
 
 
 

Wineries

}

New England
New England
New England